A spanner is a kind of hand tool.

Spanner may also refer to:

Technology and engineering
 Adjustable spanner
 Spanner, a brand of prostatic stent
 Spanner (database), distributed database technology developed by Google
 Spanner (screw drive), a type of screw drive that consists of two holes in the screw head and two pins on the tool

Arts and entertainment
 Spanner (journal), a former British periodical
 Spanners (album), by The Black Dog
 A Spanner in the Works, a Rod Stewart album
 Spanner, fictional character in Reborn! cartoons
 Ralph Spanner, a fictional character in Round the Twist
 J Spanner, creator and freelancer of J Spanner Blog.

Other uses
 Spanner (surname)
 Operation Spanner, a British police investigation
 Spanner Trust, a UK BDSM activist group, set up after the operation
 Spanner graph, several mathematical concepts; See K-spanner (disambiguation)

See also
 Dick Spanner, P.I., a British animation series